Britta Unsleber (born 25 December 1966 in Darmstadt) is former German international football player. The defender was capped 54 times for Germany, scoring 13 goals. She won two German championships and five cups with FSV Frankfurt. She also won a championship at TSV Siegen. In 1989 and 1991 she won the Women's EURO with the German national team.

Club career 

Unsleber's career began at TSV Eschollbrücken, where she had her first appearance for the senior team when only 14 years old. From 1984 on and for most of her career she played for FSV Frankfurt, where she won the championship in 1986 and 1995. With Frankfurt she also won cups in 1985, 1990, 1992, 1995, and 1996. From 1992 to 1994 Unsleber played for TSV Siegen, where she won the championship in 1994.

International career 

Unsleber was capped 54 times and scored 13 goals for Germany's national team. Her debut was on 21 November 1984 against the Netherlands. With Germany she won the 1989 and 1991 Women's EURO. Unsleber was also part of the team, which finished fourth at the 1991 FIFA Women's World Cup. She was capped for the last time against Denmark on 3 July 1993.

Coaching career 

Britta Unsleber currently is assistant coach at Sportfreunde Siegen, the club she played for between 1992 and 1994.

References 

1966 births
Living people
Women's association football defenders
German women's footballers
Germany women's international footballers
Sportspeople from Darmstadt
FSV Frankfurt (women) players
1991 FIFA Women's World Cup players
UEFA Women's Championship-winning players
Footballers from Hesse
20th-century German women